Théodore-Charles Gruyère (born 17 September 1813 in Paris, died in 1885) was a French sculptor.

In 1836 as the pupil of Auguste Dumont. He hit notoriety in 1839 winning the Prix de Rome.

His other works are some busts, some statues of saints for several churches, including the sandstone statues in the Église Saint-Augustin de Paris (1865), the sculpture named Seated Indian (1865), the characters of the town of Arras and Laon on the front of the Gare du Nord and a bas-relief in the Église Saint-Thomas-d'Aquin (Paris).

References

1813 births
1885 deaths
Artists from Paris
Prix de Rome for sculpture
19th-century French sculptors
French male sculptors
19th-century French male artists